Love from a Stranger is the name of two live BBC Television plays directed by George More O'Ferrall. The plays are based on the 1936 stage play of the same name by Frank Vosper. In turn, the play was based on the short story Philomel Cottage, written by Agatha Christie. The plays were only broadcast in the London area; television reception was geographically restricted.

The 1938 play was transmitted on Wednesday, 23 November 1938 live from Alexandra Palace. It lasted for 90 minutes and was broadcast at 3.30pm. It featured Bernard Lee, later a regular in the James Bond film series. The script used was that of the stage play by Frank Vosper; the producer/director was George More O'Ferrall.

Cast
 Bernard Lee 
 Edna Best
 Henry Oscar
 Eileen Sharp
 Esma Cannon
 Miles Otway
 Morris Harvey
 Beatrice Rowe
 Sam Lysons

See also 
 Love from a Stranger (1947 TV play)

External links
 British Film Institute entry for 1938 transmission
 Internet Movie Database entry for 1938 transmission.

British plays
BBC television dramas
Plays based on other plays
British live television shows
Plays based on short fiction
Television shows based on works by Agatha Christie
1938 plays
Television articles with incorrect naming style